The women's 3000 metres at the 2012 IAAF World Indoor Championships will be held at the Ataköy Athletics Arena on 9 and 11 March.

Medalists

Records

Qualification standards

Schedule

Results

Heats

Qualification: first 4 of each heat (Q) plus the 4 fastest times qualified (q)

Final
12 athletes from 8 countries participated. The final started at 15:51.

References

3000 metres
3000 metres at the World Athletics Indoor Championships
2012 in women's athletics